Angel Josue España (born April 4, 1995) is an American soccer player who plays as a midfielder.

Career

College & Amateur
España began playing college soccer at Florida International University in 2013, before transferring to the University of California, Santa Barbara in 2015.

During and following college, España appeared for USL League Two sides Ventura County Fusion, SIMA Águilas and Cedar Stars Rush.

Professional
In September 2019, España signed for NISA side Stumptown Athletic ahead of the league's inaugural season. He later joined NISA side Los Angeles Force.

In December 2020, España joined USL League One club Chattanooga Red Wolves SC for the 2021 season.

References

External links
 Profile at Florida International University Athletics
 Profile at University of California, Santa Barbara Athletics
 Stumptown Athletic profile
 Los Angeles Force profile

1995 births
Living people
American soccer players
Soccer players from California
Association football midfielders
FIU Panthers men's soccer players
UC Santa Barbara Gauchos men's soccer players
Ventura County Fusion players
SIMA Águilas players
Stumptown AC players
Chattanooga Red Wolves SC players
USL League Two players
National Independent Soccer Association players
Los Angeles Force players
Sportspeople from Glendale, California